Annie Doris Geeves (4 November 1914 – February 2006) was an English cricketer who played as a left-arm medium bowler. She appeared in one Test match for England in 1951, against Australia. She scored five runs and failed to take a wicket. She played domestic cricket for Nottinghamshire.

References

External links
 
 

1914 births
2006 deaths
Sportspeople from Mansfield
Cricketers from Nottinghamshire
England women Test cricketers
Nottinghamshire women cricketers